Wigan were a British speedway team that existed from 1947 to 1960. They were based at the Poolstock Stadium, Park Street, Poolstock and the Woodhouse Lane Stadium, Woodhouse Lane in Wigan. They were known as the Wigan Panthers and the Wigan Warriors at various times.

Brief history
As Wigan Warriors they first competed in the 1947 Speedway National League Division Two finishing seventh from eight teams. The team lasted barely one season with the riders transferring to Fleetwood during April of the 1948 Speedway National League Division Two season, after just three fixtures had been completed. Jack Gordon and Norman Hargreaves were the mainstays of the team which also featured Reg Lambourne, Cyril Cooper and Jack Winstanley.

In 1952 and 1953, a team known as Wigan Panthers raced at the Woodhouse Lane Stadium, but there was no league racing.

In 1960, the Wigan Warriors returned to Poolstock for open meetings during the summer months.

Season summary

References

Defunct British speedway teams
Sport in Wigan